Tyler Randal Gibbs (born October 4, 2002) is an American professional stock car racing driver. He competes full-time in the NASCAR Cup Series, driving the No. 54 Toyota Camry for Joe Gibbs Racing. Gibbs was the 2022 NASCAR Xfinity Series champion and 2021 ARCA Menards Series champion. He is the grandson of former NFL coach and current NASCAR team owner Joe Gibbs.

Racing career
Gibbs began running Shifter Karts at GoPro Motorplex in the summer of 2015 at the age of 13. In 2019, Gibbs won the IceBreaker 125 Late Model Stock race at Myrtle Beach Speedway, driving the No. 18 for Nelson Motorsports.

CARS Late Model Stock Tour
In 2017 and 2018, Gibbs competed in the CARS Late Model Stock series for Marlowe Racing. He finished 14th in the season points standings in 2017 (due to Gibbs only competing in 8 out of 13 races that year), and 8th in 2018. He has 2 pole positions, has led 90 laps, and has an average finish of 13.3, with a best finish of 2nd at Anderson Motor Speedway.

ARCA Menards Series East
Gibbs ran a partial schedule in the 2019 NASCAR K&N Pro Series East, collecting four second-place finishes in five starts in the DGR-Crosley No. 17. On September 21, Gibbs scored his first career win in his sixth start at the Apple Barrel 125 at New Hampshire Motor Speedway in the No. 54. He would compete full-time in the series, now known as the ARCA Menards Series East, the following year. He drove the No. 18 for Joe Gibbs Racing, which was fielding an entry in the series for the first time since 2012. Gibbs would win one of the series' six races on the schedule (Toledo Speedway in June) and finish runner-up to Sam Mayer in the standings, who won all other races that year. Gibbs led 104 laps at Dover in the General Tire 125 before crashing out late, marking his only DNF in the series and only finish outside the top four in any year.

He made four starts in the 2021 season, three of which were companion events with the main ARCA Menards Series. Gibbs won the pole position and the race in all four starts, leading 621 of the 625 laps he completed. As a result, he finished ninth in the standings.

ARCA Menards Series West
Gibbs made his debut in the NASCAR K&N Pro Series West in the 2019 season-finale at ISM Raceway, going on to win the race. Joe Gibbs Racing fielded cars for him and his ARCA teammate Riley Herbst in this race, using owner points from both of Levin Racing's cars, with Herbst driving the No. 10 and Gibbs driving the No. 40. He returned to run the same race the following year, this time with JGR fielding their own No. 18 car with their owner points. He led the most laps in the event but finished second after being passed by David Gilliland on the final lap. In 2021, Gibbs ran both races at Phoenix, starting on the pole and winning both events. The first event in March was a companion event with the main ARCA Menards Series, while the second race in November was the West Series season finale. Gibbs led 124 of 150 laps in the March race and all 100 laps in the fall race. He finished 19th in both the 2020 and 2021 standings.

ARCA Menards Series

Gibbs has won 18 ARCA Menards Series races and collected 38 top five finishes in a total of 47 starts.

In 2019, Gibbs ran 11 of 20 races in the ARCA Menards Series, finishing 13th in the standing after picking up wins at Gateway and Salem. The next year he competed in 16 of 20 races and finished fifth in the standings, collecting wins at Gateway, Pocono, Kentucky, Iowa, Winchester, and Memphis.

Gibbs turned 18 on October 4, 2020, which made him eligible to race on all tracks on the ARCA schedule (including Daytona and Talladega). In 2021, Gibbs ran full-time in the series in the JGR No. 18. He started the season with a 4th-place finish at Daytona, followed by a win at Phoenix and a 27th-place finish at Talladega after being involved in a crash with Greg Van Alst. At Kansas in May, he led every lap in the race en route to the win, the first time since Kevin Swindell in 2012 at Chicagoland Speedway that a driver in the series led all laps in a race. Gibbs would later replicate this feat at Charlotte two races later and at the Milwaukee Mile in August.

Gibbs ended the 2021 season as champion, having won 10 out of 20 races. He spent the season in a close points battle with Corey Heim and finished in the top five in every race except Talladega Superspeedway, where he crashed out of the top five and finished 27th.

Xfinity Series

2021

On January 26, 2021, JGR announced that Gibbs would make his Xfinity Series debut in 2021 at the Daytona Road Course, which would be the first race of a part-time schedule he would run in the team's No. 54 car. He shared the ride with Kyle Busch, Denny Hamlin, Martin Truex Jr., John Hunter Nemechek, and Ty Dillon.

On the Daytona Road Course, Gibbs held off Austin Cindric in overtime to win, becoming the sixth driver to win in their Xfinity debut (after Dale Earnhardt, Ricky Rudd, Joe Ruttman, Terry Labonte, and Kurt Busch) and the first to do so without prior experience in the NASCAR Cup Series. He is also the only driver in the modern era (1972–present) to win their first NASCAR national series race. At 18 years, four months, and 16 days of age, Gibbs surpassed Cindric as the youngest driver to win an Xfinity road course race. Gibbs later won again at Charlotte Motor Speedway in May. At Road America, one of Gibbs's races, Kyle Busch ran the No. 54, leading JGR to put Gibbs in the No. 81 with Monster Energy as a sponsor. Gibbs would end up 33rd after a broken transmission. At Watkins Glen International in the No. 54, Gibbs led the most laps and won after holding off Austin Cindric and A. J. Allmendinger. He later led the most laps in the race at Richmond Raceway in September before ending up 7th. Gibbs got his fourth win of the season in the Kansas Lottery 300 in October and finished the season 13th in the final standings, despite only having started 18 of the season's 33 races in addition to winning Rookie of the Year honors.

2022: Xfinity Series Champion
For 2022, Gibbs moved into the series full-time, driving the No. 54. He won early in the season at Las Vegas, Atlanta, and Richmond. At the Martinsville spring race on April 8, Gibbs led 196 laps but was passed by teammate Brandon Jones on the final lap and finished eighth after a bump from Sam Mayer in the final turn. After the race, Gibbs ran into Mayer's car during the cool-down lap before both drivers engaged in a fistfight on pit road. Following this incident, Gibbs was fined 15,000 for hitting Mayer's car on pit road after the race. Gibbs scored his fourth win at Road America in July by passing Kyle Larson on the final lap and claimed his fifth win of the season a month later at Michigan. At Watkins Glen, Gibbs fiercely battled William Byron for the lead throughout most of the race until they both spun off-course during the final restart, resulting in Gibbs finishing 27th. At the Martinsville playoff race, Gibbs made contact with Jones which sent him spinning towards outside wall on the final overtime lap to win the race despite having already clinched a spot in the Championship four on points. After the race, he compared himself to Jesus in an interview on the SiriusXM NASCAR channel, which earned him criticism from sections of the NASCAR fanbase. Nonetheless, Gibbs dominated at Phoenix to become the 2022 NASCAR Xfinity Series champion.

Cup Series

2022

On July 24, 2022, 23XI Racing announced that Gibbs would make his NASCAR Cup Series debut at the 2022 M&M's Fan Appreciation 400 at Pocono the same day, driving the No. 45 car as a fill-in for the original driver, Kurt Busch. Busch was not cleared by NASCAR to race after suffering from concussion-like symptoms following a crash during qualifying. Gibbs finished 16th in the race. Three days later, he would be announced to fill in again for Busch in the Verizon 200 at Indianapolis, where he finished 17th. In the FireKeepers Casino 400 at Michigan, Gibbs scored his first career top-10 with a 10th place finish, but finished 36th the following week at Richmond after an engine failure. Gibbs filled in for Busch during the last two regular season races at Watkins Glen and Daytona, in which he finished 26th and 13th respectively. On August 31, it was announced that he would swap rides with teammate Bubba Wallace and drive the No. 23 car starting at Darlington; Wallace went to the No. 45 to help the team's owners' championship efforts. At the Texas playoff race, Gibbs veered into Ty Dillon on pit road, nearly sending Dillon towards a NASCAR official and a group of pit crew members; he was subsequently fined 75,000 and the No. 23 was docked 25 owner points. Gibbs would end up missing the last race of his fill-in role for 23XI, the 2022 NASCAR Cup Series Championship Race, due to the death of his father Coy and was replaced by Daniel Hemric.

2023
In 2023, Gibbs joined the NASCAR Cup Series on a full-time basis, driving the newly rebranded No. 54 for Joe Gibbs Racing.

Personal life
Gibbs is the grandson of former Washington Redskins head coach and owner of Joe Gibbs Racing, Joe Gibbs, and the son of the late former Washington Redskins assistant coach and former NASCAR driver Coy Gibbs and Charlotte-area realtor Heather Gibbs. He is the nephew of the late Joe Gibbs Racing co-owner J. D. Gibbs, as well as the cousin of former Appalachian State University quarterback Jackson Gibbs and tight end Miller Gibbs.

Motorsports career results

Stock car career summary

† As Gibbs was a guest driver, he was ineligible for championship points.

NASCAR
(key) (Bold – Pole position awarded by qualifying time. Italics – Pole position earned by points standings or practice time. * – Most laps led.)

Cup Series

Daytona 500

Xfinity Series

 Season still in progress
 Ineligible for series points

ARCA Menards Series
(key) (Bold – Pole position awarded by qualifying time. Italics – Pole position earned by points standings or practice time. * – Most laps led. ** – All laps led.)

ARCA Menards Series East

ARCA Menards Series West

References

External links

 
 

2002 births
Living people
NASCAR drivers
ARCA Menards Series drivers
Racing drivers from Charlotte, North Carolina
Joe Gibbs Racing drivers

NASCAR Xfinity Series champions